Blue Murder is an Australian live television play which aired in 1959 on ABC. Broadcast live in Sydney on 2 December 1959, a kinescope ("telerecording") was made of the broadcast so it could be shown in Melbourne (it is not known if it was also shown on ABC's then-new stations in Adelaide and Brisbane).

It is not known if the kinescope recording still exists. Filmink magazine wrote "it sounds as if it would be great, campy fun."

Premise
On Sydney's north shore, an ageing actress, Thelma Lane-Forest, is killed by her bitter and untalented son, Ricky. The son's girlfriend, Jeanette, has a brother, Philip, who is a theatre critic. A journalist, Lundy, also becomes involved.

Cast
Ric Hutton as Ricky Lane-Forest
Nancye Stewart as Thelma Lane-Forest
Derani Scarr as Jeanette Gage
Colin Croft as Philip Gage
Hugh Stewart as Martin Johnson
Richard Davies as Lundy

Reception
The Sydney Morning Herald felt the plot was illogical, but also called it a "neatly constructed thriller, very competently produced" with "enough gloss on the writing and production to overcome any lingering questions raised by logic; and the play succeeded admirably on its own chosen level - it was craftsmanlike, thoroughly professional and pleasantly diverting."

The story was also adapted into a radio play which was broadcast in 1960.

See also
List of live television plays broadcast on Australian Broadcasting Corporation (1950s)

References

External links
Blue Murder at IMDb
Blue Murder at National Film and Sound Archive
Blue Murder at National Archives of Australia
Blue Murder at AustLit

1959 television plays
1950s Australian television plays
Australian Broadcasting Corporation original programming
English-language television shows
Black-and-white Australian television shows
Australian live television shows